Hopewell Rugoho-Chin'ono is a Zimbabwean journalist. He has won numerous awards in journalism and has worked in both print and broadcasting journalism. He was a fellow at Harvard.

History
Hopewell Rugoho-Chin'ono is a documentary film maker and international journalist. He was the ITV News Africa Field Producer from 2008 to 2015 and The New York Times ZIMBABWE foreign correspondent from 2015 to 2017.

Hopewell trained as a journalist at the Zimbabwean Institute of Mass Communications before getting his first post graduate Master of Arts degree in International Journalist from City University's Journalism school in London, England.

After graduating from City University, he worked with the BBC World Service as a freelance radio producer.
In 2003 he returned to his native Zimbabwe to work for the BBC as a freelance correspondent.

Unfortunately the Zimbabwean Government refused to accredit him as a journalist unless he worked with a pro-government media house, he refused.

He won a British Government Chevening scholarship in 2006 to read film at Brunel University, where he obtained a Master of Arts degree in Documentary Practice in 2007.

He returned to Zimbabwe in 2007 and made a documentary film called Pain in My Heart.
Pain in my Heart won the 2008 CNN African Journalist of the year award, 2008 Archbishop Desmond Tutu Leadership Award and the Kaiser Family Foundation Award for Excellence in HIV/AIDS Reporting in Africa.

After making Pain in My Heart he set up Television International in Zimbabwe, a production house that produced news for ITN and South Africa's e.tv. 
He has also worked with CNN International as a field producer on special assignments and produced for Sky News, BBC Newsnight and Ireland's RTE.

In 2008 he went to the University of Oxford’s Saïd Business School where he was awarded The Tutu Fellowship in African Leadership. 
Hopewell is also a Nieman Fellow at Harvard University, the third Zimbabwean journalist of only three to have won the most prestigious Fellowship in journalism in 2009. 
In 2009 he was the winner of the US Aid Communication award in Zimbabwe for his HIV and Aids Reporting. In 2010 he was nominated for a Rory Peck television award for his documentary film A Violent Response. A Violent Response was also nominated for a 2010 BANFF World Television Award in Canada.

Hopewell Rugoho-Chin'ono was the television producer for UK's ITV News, which is part of the Independent Television News Group and the Zimbabwe Foreign Correspondent for The New York Times.

He worked as South Africa's eNCA foreign correspondent and producer in Zimbabwe from February 2008 to April 2014. He is a multi-skilled television journalist who does Correspondence, Producing, Camera and Editing work.

He has left journalism to return to documentary filmmaking.  He directed the only mental health film made in Africa, the award winning State of Mind, a film looking at Zimbabwe’s mental illness epidemic.

In 2020, Hopewell reported on alleged Covid-19 procurement fraud within the health ministry, which led to the arrest and sacking of Health Minister Obadiah Moyo. 
It was President Emmerson Mnangagwa who fired Obadiah in July for "inappropriate conduct" over the $60 million medicines supply scandal. 

On July 20, 2020, Hopewell was arrested and charged with inciting public violence. The US embassy called Hopewell's arrest "deeply concerning", while his lawyer called it "an abduction" and Amnesty accused Zimbabwean authorities of "misusing the criminal justice system to persecute journalists and activists". He was freed in September on bail, then he was arrested again in November 2020 and was charged with obstructing justice and contempt of court for a tweet about the court outcome of a gold smuggling scandal involving the President's niece.

Hopewell Chin’ono was released on bail on January 27, 2021 after spending three weeks in prison. Chin’ono expressed concern about the COVID-19 pandemic in the overcrowded Chikurubi Prison and accuses the government of harassment for arresting him three times in five months.

Professional awards

2022 

He won the International Anti-Corruption Excellence Award which was handed to him by the Emir Sheikh Tamim bin Hamad Al Thani in Doha in the presence of President Paul Kagame of Rwanda, United Nations Under Secretary General, Dr Ghada Waly and the United Nations Special Advocate for the Prevention of Corruption, Dr. Al Marri.

2020 

He won the People Journalism Prize for 2020 for his exposure o the massive Covid-19 looting of public funds.

2013 
Fearless: Beatrice Mtetwa & the Rule of Law. Co-produced with Lorie Conway.
The documentary film looks at the life and works of Beatrice Mtetwa, a Zimbabwean human rights lawyer. It tells the story of the Rule of Law in Zimbabwe through the narratives of Beatrice's clients from journalists, human rights activist, opposition politician and gender activists. Aired on CNBC and Channel 4
The 2014 One Media Awards nomination in documentary section

2010 
A Violent Response
The documentary film looks at Zimbabwe's post-election violence.
Hopewell Rugoho-Chin’ono worked on the production as the director, executive producer and director of photography.

The film won:
The 2010 BANNF nomination in Canada
The 2010 Rory Peck Award nomination for feature in London

2008 
Last White Man, co-produced with Greek National Television.
The film looks at the White Zimbabwean farmers and the Land Reform process.
It is the image of Africa's ex-granary that became synonymous with poverty, inflation, corruption. It also looks at the historical aspects of the Land issue in Zimbabwe.
Hopewell Rugoho-Chin’ono worked on the production as a Co-producer, Director of photography and Co-director.

2008 
Inside Zimbabwe: Y Byd ar Bedwar, co-produced with ITV Wales, UK.
A look at the starvation and levels of political intolerance taking place in Zimbabwe caused by bad governance and exacerbated by hyper inflation. This film was shot undercover for ITV Wales.
Hopewell Rugoho-Chin’ono worked on the production as a Co-producer, Director of photography and Co-director.

2007 
Pain in my Heart.
A heart-breaking story of the HIV and Aids situation in Zimbabwe. It traces two HIV-infected Zimbabweans, one is on life saving Anti-Retroviral medication courtesy of a local church, the other is a single mother of two who fails to get medication and as a result dies, leaving two orphans. The film is a metaphor of the political situation in Zimbabwe.
Hopewell Rugoho-Chin’ono worked on the production as the Documentary Film Director, Executive Producer and Co-director of photography.

The film won:
The 2008 African Journalist of the year award
The 2008 Henry Kaiser Foundation award for HIV & Aids Reporting in Africa
The 2008 Archbishop Desmond Tutu Leadership award
The 2009 USAID Communication Award

Academic qualifications

2007
Master of Arts Degree in Documentary Practice
Brunel University, London, United Kingdom.

2000
Master of Arts Degree in International Journalism
City University, London, United Kingdom.

1993
Higher National Diploma in Mass Communications
Zimbabwe Institute of Mass Communications, Harare, Zimbabwe.

Scholarship awards

2009
Robert Waldo Ruhl Scholarship Fund for Journalism to study at Harvard University as a Nieman Fellow in Cambridge, USA.

2006
Chevening British Government Scholarship to study Documentary Film Making at Brunel University in London, England.

Academic fellowships

2010
Nieman Global Health Journalism Fellowship
Harvard University, Cambridge, Massachusetts, USA.

2008
Archbishop Desmond Tutu Fellowship for Young African Leaders
Said Business School, University of Oxford, Oxford, United Kingdom.

Professional fellowships
CNN Journalism Fellowship

References

External links
Funmi Iyana's Blogspot

Nieman Fellows
Zimbabwean journalists
Living people
Year of birth missing (living people)
21st-century Zimbabwean writers
21st-century journalists
21st-century male writers
Male journalists